Szibill is an operetta by Miksa Bródy and Ferenc Martos, with music by Victor Jacobi. First performed on February 27, 1914, at the Királyszinház (King's Theatre) in Budapest starring Sári Fedák in the title role, it rapidly made its way around Europe. An English-language version by Harry Graham, entitled Sybil and containing additional numbers by Jacobi to lyrics by Harry B. Smith, was first performed on January 10, 1916 at the Liberty Theatre in New York, with Julia Sanderson. Graham's version was later introduced by the George Edwardes Company at the Prince's Theatre, Manchester on 26 December 1920, and at Daly's Theatre in London on 19 February 1921, with José Collins as Sybil.

Synopsis

Act 1
The Grand Hotel of a provincial, Russian town. Szibill (or "Sybil") Renaud is a young French singer recently arrived in Bomsk (Tomsk). She encounters the army Lieutenant Paul Petrov, a guards officer who fell in love with her in St Petersburg and who has now deserted his regiment, begging Szibill to run away with him back to Paris. When the town Governor arrives with a warrant to arrest Petrov, Szibill protests so strongly that the governor thinks she must be the Grand Duchess who is expected to arrive in the city that day with her husband the Grand Duke Constantine. Szibill goes along with the deception; and after a series of close shaves also involving her manager Poire and his young wife Margot (Charlotte in the Hungarian original), the Governor leaves with his troop of hussars, while Szibill leaves for a ball, still pretending to be the Grand Duchess. Finally the Grand Duke himself arrives. Puzzled to find that his "wife's" shawl (which in her hurry Szibill has left behind) is not one he recognises, he too leaves for the reception.

Act 2
That evening, at the ball in the Governor's palace. The Grand Duke arrives but decides to play along with Szibill's deception that she is his wife, taking the opportunity to press for her favours. Szibill becomes very nervous and sends Petrov to find the real Grand Duchess (Anna) back at the hotel. When Anna sweeps into the ball, she is announced as Madame Sybill Renaud of the Opéra-Comique, Paris. Taken aback, The Grand Duke becomes jealous: he returns to the hotel with Szibill, leaving his wife to come back with Petrov.

Act 3
At the Grand Hotel. The Grand Duke apologises to Szibill for his unwanted advances, while Anna's jealousy is calmed by Petrov. Poire and Margot (who had apparently been seduced by the Governor) sort out their differences too, Szibill succeeds in obtaining a pardon for Petrov's desertion, and all ends happily as the singer looks forward to an unclouded new life with her lover in Paris.

Sources
 
 Kemp, Peter (1987). Liner Notes: Treasures of Operetta II. Chandos Records
 New York Times (January 11, 1916). "'Sybil Presented with Three Stars"

See also
The Marriage Market by the same lyricist and composers

Hungarian-language operettas
1914 operas
Russia in fiction
Operas by Victor Jacobi